The Numbers were an Australian power pop band formed by siblings Annalisse (bass guitar, lead vocals) and Chris Morrow (lead guitar, lead vocals) in early 1978. They issued two studio albums, The Numbers (October 1980), which peaked at No. 29 on the Kent Music Report Albums Chart, and 39.51 (April 1982). The group disbanded in 1984, the Morrows formed another band, Maybe Dolls, in 1991.

History 

The Numbers were formed early in 1978 in Sydney by Annalisse Morrow on bass guitar and lead vocals and her elder brother, Chris Morrow on lead guitar and lead vocals; they were joined by Marty Newcombe on drums. Australian musicologist, Ian McFarlane, observed that they "emerged from the post-punk Sydney scene with a clean sound and a strong sense of direction. In spite of a regular touring schedule and a brace of accessible pop releases, the band never made the commercial breakthrough for which they so vigorously strived."

In January 1979 Newcombe was replaced on drums and percussion by Simon Vidale. The group supported the Australian leg of a tour by United Kingdom rockers, XTC. The Numbers released their debut three-track, extended play, Govt. Boy, on the Local Records label in September. All the tracks were written or co-written by Chris. McFarlane felt that it "featured three dazzling blasts of tough guitar pop reminiscent of The Jam or The Buzzcocks."

Late in 1979 the group signed with Deluxe Records, which issued their debut single, "The Modern Song", in the following March. The second single, "Five Letter Word", reached the Kent Music Report Singles Chart top 40. A third single, "Mr President" (February 1981) failed to chart. Their debut album, The Numbers, appeared in October 1980, which reached No. 29 on the Kent Music Report Albums Chart. It was produced by Cameron Allan and was recorded at EMI Studios 301, Sydney in mid-year.

Members
 Graham `Buzz' Bidstrup
 John Bliss
 Craig Bloxom
 Russell Handley
 Annalisse Morrow
 Chris Morrow
 Marty Newcombe
 Colin Newham
 Marcus Phelan
 Gary Roberts
 Simon Vidale

Discography

Studio albums

Compilations

Extended plays

Singles

Awards and nominations

TV Week / Countdown Awards
Countdown was an Australian pop music TV series on national broadcaster ABC-TV from 1974–1987, it presented music awards from 1979–1987, initially in conjunction with magazine TV Week. The TV Week / Countdown Awards were a combination of popular-voted and peer-voted awards.

|-
| 1980
| Annalise Morrow (The Numbers)
| Most Popular Female Performer
| 
|-

References

Australian power pop groups
Musical groups established in 1978
Musical groups disestablished in 1984
1978 establishments in Australia
1984 disestablishments in Australia